The Cleveland Orchestra Youth Orchestra (COYO) is a group of 100 young musicians, selected from over 45 cities across Ohio and Pennsylvania.

Activities
The members rehearse weekly at Severance Hall and are regularly coached by members of the Cleveland Orchestra. The orchestra's Music Director is currently Daniel Reith, assistant conductor of the Cleveland Orchestra. COYO also has the opportunity to work with many of the famous guest conductors that visit to work with the Cleveland Orchestra.

COYO performs three subscription concerts per season at Severance Hall. Additionally, they perform at least three "outreach concerts", performances in the greater Cleveland area. One of COYO's subscription performances includes a performance with the Cleveland Orchestra Youth Chorus.

History

Directors
COYO is in its 31st season (2016–17) since it began in 1986 under the direction of Music Director Jahja Ling.

National Youth Orchestra Festival
In 1998, COYO participated in the second National Youth Orchestra Festival sponsored by the American Symphony Orchestra League. COYO was one of five youth orchestras that were selected to participate out of a pool of orchestras across the nation.

Past concerts
COYO is in its 31st season. It typically performs three subscription concerts each season. Subscription concerts are usually held at Severance Hall.  COYO also plays community outreach concerts, in which the group travels to a nearby venue to perform.  Many of these outreach concerts are held at schools and universities.  Additionally, COYO performs at the annual MLK Community Open House at Severance Hall.  The Open House is a day of concerts in remembrance of Martin Luther King Jr.

Premieres
COYO has had the opportunity to host world premieres of several modern works throughout the years and has commissioned pieces, as well. The most recent piece commissioned is Roger Briggs' Fountain of Youth, which was premiered on November 18, 2016.

Repertoire
COYO typically performs classical works.  In the past, the group has performed pieces by Stravinsky, Beethoven, Brahms, Schubert, Tchaikovsky, Dvořák, Shostakovich, Sibelius, Wagner, Mozart, and many others.

Orchestration
COYO is a full symphonic orchestra ensemble.  The group typically consists of violins, violas, cellos, string bass, flutes, oboes, clarinets, bassoons, French horns, trumpets, trombones, tuba, and percussion.  Auxiliary instruments are used according to the instrumentation of the concert repertoire.  Common auxiliary instruments are harp, piccolo, E-flat clarinet and bass clarinet, English horn, and organ.

Tours
COYO has participated in tours, extending their outreach from the greater Cleveland area to the world. Past tours have included:
2009 Massachusetts tour to Worcester, Boston, Cambridge and Lexington
2001 tour included performances in Carnegie Hall and in Eisenhower Auditorium, Penn State University

COYO performed in Vienna, Prague, and Salzburg in June 2012.

In June 2015, COYO performed in its first tour of China, making its first appearance in Asia; they played in major concert halls Beijing, Tianjin, Shanghai, and Ningbo.

In June 2019, COYO performed in Sankt Florian, Vienna, Bratislava and Budapest.

Auditions
Auditions take place annually for each season.  Auditions are open to all middle-high school students who study privately.  COYO auditions are live and typically take place at Severance Hall.

Rehearsals
COYO rehearses weekly at the home of The Cleveland Orchestra - Severance Hall for four hours including breaks.  Dress rehearsals are also scheduled immediately preceding a concert.

Coachings
Members of COYO have the unique opportunity to study with members of The Cleveland Orchestra.  Coachings take place during one of the orchestra's rehearsals.  Coaching groups are usually divided by Woodwinds, Brass, and Strings.  Additional coachings are sometimes scheduled for smaller groups (i.e. specifically Cellos, Trumpets, Flutes, etc.).

See also
Cleveland Youth Wind Symphony

References

External links

Musical groups from Cleveland
American youth orchestras
Musical groups established in 1986
1986 establishments in Ohio
Youth organizations based in Ohio
Orchestras based in Ohio